Dejan Joksimović (born January 10, 1965) is a Serbian retired footballer and current players agent.

Playing career
He won two Yugoslav championships in row with different clubs, Red Star and Vojvodina. After Yugoslavia, he also played in Spain, Australia and the Czechoslovakia. With Red Star he won national Championships in 1987/88 and 1990/91, with Vojvodina in 1988/89, and with Partizan he won the Yugoslav Supercup in 1989/90.

Post playing
After retiring, he has started a career as players agent, representing, among others, the Serbian national team stars Aleksandar Kolarov, Miloš Krasić, Branislav Ivanović, and Milan Jovanović. He also started the international careers of Ivica Olic, Nemanja Vidic and Ognjen Koroman.

In 2008, he presided over the controversial move that sent talented 17-year-old Uroš Ćosić from Red Star to CSKA Moscow.

References

External links
Stats from Yugoslav League at Zerodic

Living people
Footballers from Belgrade
Yugoslav footballers
Association football midfielders
Serbian footballers
Serbian expatriate footballers
Expatriate soccer players in Australia
Expatriate footballers in Spain
Expatriate footballers in Czechoslovakia
Yugoslav First League players
National Soccer League (Australia) players
FK Partizan players
FK Rad players
OFK Beograd players
FK Vojvodina players
Red Star Belgrade footballers
AC Sparta Prague players
CD Lugo players
Heidelberg United FC players
1965 births
Serbian sports agents